Ross Township is one of eleven townships in Lake County, Indiana. As of the 2010 census, its population was 47,890 and it contained 19,951 housing units.

History
Ross Township was established in 1848. It was named for William Ross, a pioneer settler.

Geography
The township includes the town of Merrillville, as well as portions of the city of Hobart.

Education

Ross Township is served by the Merrillville Community School Corporation which includes Merrillville High School. The privately owned and operated Andrean High School is also located within the township.

References

External links
 Indiana Township Association
 United Township Association of Indiana
 Ross Township Website

Townships in Lake County, Indiana
Townships in Indiana
populated places established in 1848
1848 establishments in Indiana